Saint Michael's Square is a square in Old Kyiv, Ukraine. Located in the Shevchenkivskyi District of Kyiv, the square lies in front of Saint Michael's Golden-Domed Monastery.

Also, one of the monastery's external walls bordering the square serves as The Wall of Remembrance of the Fallen for Ukraine, a Russo-Ukrainian War memorial.

The square served as one of the fan zones during the Eurovision Song Contest 2017. Since May 2022 it hosts destroyed Russian military equipment exhibition that features Russian military equipment captured and destroyed during the 2022 Russian invasion of Ukraine.

References 

Shevchenkivskyi District, Kyiv
Squares in Kyiv